Zhongjiang Pagoda (中江塔 or Jiang Tower) is a  five level or story Pagoda, situated between the Qingyi and Yangtze (Changjiang) Rivers in Wuhu City, Anhui Province, China.

History

The Zhongjiang Pagoda was constructed in 1618, during the Ming Dynasty, and rebuilt in 1669 during the Qing dynasty, was a navigation aid for boats and ships later known as a lighthouse, and is maintained by the Maritime Safety Administration.

The Pagoda was repaired in 1669 during the Qing Dynasty, rebuilt in 1988, and is a key preservation unit of historical and cultural relics in Wuhu. The top of the Pagoda fell off during the 2008 Sichuan earthquake.

Construction
The Zhongjiang Pagoda is octagonal in shape, constructed of concrete and wood. The second, third, and fourth floors, as well as the roof, are constructed with "flying eaves".

See also
 List of lighthouses in China

References

Towers completed in 1618
Lighthouses in China
Buildings and structures in Wuhu
1618 establishments in China